Panama has qualified once for the FIFA World Cup, the 2018 edition. They directly qualified after securing the third spot in the hexagonal on the final round. This meant that after 10 failed qualification campaigns, Panama appeared at the World Cup for the first time in their history.

Overall record 

*Draws include knockout matches decided via penalty shoot-out.

Russia 2018

Following a 2–1 home win over Costa Rica in the final round of the hexagonal, Panama secured their spot in Russia 2018, finishing third in the CONCACAF qualification.

Group stage

Record players

Seven players were fielded in all three of Panama FIFA World Cup matches in 2018, making them record World Cup players for their country.

Top goalscorers

At a score of 6–0 in favour of England at the 2018 World Cup, Felipe Baloy scored after a long free kick by Ricardo Avila for Panama's first World Cup goal. In the following match against Tunisia, Panama scored through an own goal by Tunisian defender Yassine Meriah.

References

External links
 Panama at FIFA.com

 
Countries at the FIFA World Cup